Chepkongony is a village near Kaptagat in the Uasin Gishu County, Kenya. It is part of Wareng County Council and Eldoret East Constituency.

It is the birthplace of famous runner Benjamin Limo.

There is also village called Chepkongony in Nandi County and Kericho County

References 

Populated places in Rift Valley Province
Uasin Gishu County